Events from the year 1805 in the United Kingdom. This is the year of the Battle of Trafalgar.

Incumbents
 Monarch – George III
 Prime Minister –  William Pitt the Younger (Tory)
 Foreign Secretary – Dudley Ryder, 1st Earl of Harrowby (until 11 January) Henry Phipps, 1st Earl of Mulgrave (from 11 January)
 Parliament – 2nd

Events
 20 January – London Docks open.
 5 February – East Indiaman Earl of Abergavenny is wrecked in Weymouth Bay with the loss of 263 lives.
 21 February – Charles Manners-Sutton confirmed as Archbishop of Canterbury.
 18 April – Ordnance Survey begins systematic publication of its General Survey of England and Wales ("Old Series") maps to a scale of one inch to the mile (1:63,360) with those for Essex.
 4 June – the first Trooping the Colour ceremony at the Horse Guards Parade in London.
 3 August – the annual cricket match between Eton College and Harrow School is played for the first time.
 21 October
 Napoleonic Wars: Battle of Trafalgar – British naval fleet led by Admiral Horatio Nelson defeats a combined French and Spanish fleet off the coast of Spain. Admiral Nelson is fatally shot.
 An underground explosion at Hebburn colliery on Tyneside kills 35.
 23 October – troopship Aeneas is wrecked off Newfoundland with the loss of 340 lives.
 6 November – news of the victory at Trafalgar and Nelson's death reaches London.
 26 November – the Ellesmere Canal's Pontcysyllte Aqueduct is opened in Wales, the tallest and longest in Britain.

Concluded Wars
 Anglo-Spanish War, 1796–1808
 Napoleonic Wars, 1803–1815

Publications
 John Dalton's paper "On the Absorption of Gases by Water and Other Liquids". Memoirs of the Literary and Philosophical Society of Manchester, 2nd series 1: pp. 271–87, including the first published list of standard atomic weights.
 Walter Scott's narrative poem The Lay of the Last Minstrel.
 First printed version of the folk song "Bobby Shafto's Gone to Sea" in its modern (Tyneside) version.
 First printed version of the nonconformist hymn tune "Cranbrook", later used for the folk song "On Ilkla Moor Baht 'at".

Births
 27 January – Samuel Palmer, landscape watercolourist (died 1881)
 4 February – W. Harrison Ainsworth, historical novelist (died 1882)
 8 March – Rayner Stephens, Scottish-born radical reformer and Methodist minister (died 1879)
 20 March – Thomas Cooper, Chartist, poet and religious lecturer (died 1892) 
 5 July
 Jérôme Napoléon Bonaparte, agriculturalist, nephew of Napoleon I (died 1870 in the United States)
 Robert FitzRoy, admiral and meteorologist (suicide 1865)
 9 August – Joseph Locke, railway civil engineer (died 1860)
 29 August – Frederick Denison Maurice, theologian (died 1872)
 7 November – Thomas Brassey, railway contractor (died 1870)
 20 December – Thomas Graham, Scottish-born chemist (died 1869)
 22 December – John O. Westwood, entomologist (died 1893)

Deaths
 2 January – Alexander Wedderburn, 1st Earl of Rosslyn, Lord Chancellor (born 1733)
 3 January – Charles Towneley, antiquary (born 1737)
 30 January – John Robison, physicist (born 1739)
 18 January – John Moore, Archbishop of Canterbury (born 1730)
 2 February – Thomas Banks, sculptor (born 1735)
 25 February 
 William Buchan, doctor (born 1729)
 Thomas Pownall, colonial statesman (born 1722)
 7 May – William Petty, 2nd Earl of Shelburne, Prime Minister (born 1737)
 25 May –  William Paley, philosopher (born 1743)
 3 August – Christopher Anstey, writer (born 1724)
 28 August – Alexander Carlyle, church leader (born 1722)
 5 October – Charles Cornwallis, 1st Marquess Cornwallis, general (born 1738)
 21 October – Horatio Nelson, admiral (mortally wounded in battle) (born 1758)

See also
 1805 in Scotland

References

 
Years of the 19th century in the United Kingdom